Memory Church is a church in Ajuda (Lisbon), Portugal. It holds the Mausoleum of the Sebastião José de Carvalho e Melo, 1st Marquis of Pombal
It is classified as a National Monument.

About 
The Memory Church built entirely of limestone was dedicated to the survival of the King Joseph I from the assassination attempt by Távora family in 1758. The church was constructed in Baroque style with neoclassical characteristics and crowned by a dome.

The Memory Church was classified as National Monument in 1923.

See also 
 Churches in Portugal

References

External links 
Memória Church

Roman Catholic churches in Lisbon
National monuments in Lisbon District